Fear and Fancy is a 30-minute American Sci-fi television anthology series. Fifteen episodes aired on the American Broadcasting Company from May 13, 1953 to August 26, 1953.

External links
Fear and Fancy at CVTA

1950s American anthology television series
1953 American television series debuts
1953 American television series endings
American Broadcasting Company original programming
Science fiction anthology television series